Luba Goy (born November 8, 1945) is a Canadian actress, comedian and one of the stars of Royal Canadian Air Farce.

Life and career
Goy was born in Haltern, Germany, to Ukrainian parents and raised in Ottawa, Ontario, Canada. They immigrated to Canada in 1951.  She is a graduate of the Glebe Collegiate Institute in Ottawa, Ontario. In 1969, she graduated from the National Theatre School of Canada, then went on to act in theatre productions in Stratford, Ontario. In 1971, she joined "The Jest Society", a comedy troupe, which evolved into the Royal Canadian Air Farce in 1973. In the early 1980s, she starred (as herself, alongside Billy Van) in an educational series on computers called Bits and Bytes. Produced by TVOntario, the show was aired by PBS stations in the United States.

Later that decade, she played Lotsa Heart Elephant, Treat Heart Pig and Gentle Heart Lamb in Nelvana's animated Care Bears franchise. As part of the Air Farce team, Goy has won 15 ACTRA awards, a Juno, the Maclean's Honour Roll, and was among the first Canadians to be inducted into the International Humour Hall of Fame. In 1993, Goy and her Air Farce cast members received Honorary Doctor of Law degrees from Brock University. In 1996, Goy received the Outstanding Achievement Award from Women in Film and Television. In 1998, Goy, along with her Air Farce colleagues, received the Governor General's Performing Arts Award for Lifetime Artistic Achievement, Canada's highest honour in the performing arts.

She has also done voices for various animated TV series featuring The Elephant Show, Babar, AlfTales, My Pet Monster, Sylvanian Families, Tales from the Cryptkeeper, The Rosey and Buddy Show, Rupert, The New Archies, Little Shop, Jayce and the Wheeled Warriors, and Wild C.A.T.s.

Within the Ukrainian Canadian community she occasionally has comedy performances that highlight her Ukrainian heritage.  One such example was her involvement in 1999 with the Ukrainian pavilion at Folklorama, a cultural festival in Winnipeg, Manitoba. She speaks Ukrainian fluently. Luba's film roles have included an 18th-century innkeeper in the Ukrainian film Vid'ma (Відьма, Witch), filmed in 1990 in Kiev.

In 2011, she performed at the Toronto Ukrainian Festival. In May 2012 Luba Goy debuted her one-person show Luba, Simply Luba at the Berkeley Street Theatre, Toronto.

Characters portrayed by Goy 

Yoko Ono
Ann Medina
Hillary Clinton
Anne McLellan
Rita MacNeil
Ethel Blondin-Andrew
Barbra Streisand
Wendy Mesley
Elizabeth II
Alexa McDonough
Pamela Wallin
Sheila Copps
Adrienne Clarkson
Elizabeth Taylor
Laura Bush
Bev Oda
Bobbie Battista
Margaret Atwood
Elizabeth May
Martha Stewart
Suze Orman
Lorena Bobbitt
Kim Campbell
Madeleine Albright
Sharon Carstairs
Donald Duck
Anita Sarkeesian
John Leguizamo
Theresa May
Bif Naked
Eva Braun
List is Incomplete

She also provided voices for the animated Care Bears characters Lotsa Heart Elephant, Treat Heart Pig and Gentle Heart Lamb.

Filmography

Television

Film

References

External links 
 

Canadian television personalities
Canadian television actresses
Canadian voice actresses
Canadian women comedians
Canadian film actresses
Royal Canadian Air Farce
Governor General's Performing Arts Award winners
National Theatre School of Canada alumni
German emigrants to Canada
Canadian people of Ukrainian descent
1945 births
Living people
Canadian radio personalities
Canadian sketch comedians
Actresses from Ottawa
Canadian women television personalities
Canadian impressionists (entertainers)
20th-century Canadian comedians
21st-century Canadian comedians
Comedians from Ontario